The 1991–92 season was Blackpool F.C.'s 84th season (81st consecutive) in the Football League. They competed in the 22-team Division Four, then the fourth tier of English football. They finished fourth, missing out on automatic promotion by one point for the second consecutive season after a final-day defeat at Lincoln City, and were promoted via the play-offs to the new Division Two. It was Billy Ayre's first full season as manager.

The first two home League fixtures saw Blackpool extend their win streak at Bloomfield Road to fifteen League games. Their 24-game unbeaten run at home ended, after just over a year, with a defeat by Crewe Alexandra on 23 November.

Dave Bamber was the club's top scorer for the second consecutive season, with 36 goals (28 in the league, one in the play-offs, one in the FA Cup and six in the League Cup).

The six goals Blackpool scored against Aldershot were expunged from the record books when the latter went out of business in March 1992, hence only 71 of Blackpool's actual 77 league goals scored in the 1991–92 season are accounted for in the table below.

Table

Play-offs

Semi-finals
Blackpool and Barnet met in the two-legged semi-finals of the play-offs. Barnet won the first leg by a single goal, at Underhill on 10 May. Blackpool, however, managed to turn the tie around in the return leg at Bloomfield Road three days later. Paul Groves (40') and an Andy Garner penalty in front of the South Stand, ten minutes into the second half, gave the Seasiders a 2–0 victory on the night and 2–1 on aggregate. A pitch invasion ensued at the final whistle.

Final
On 23 May, Blackpool met Scunthorpe United in the final at Wembley. Blackpool manager Billy Ayre was accompanied by the club mascot — his son, David — during the pre-match walk out to the centre circle.

The game finished 1–1 after normal time and extra time, a Tony Daws strike equalising Dave Bamber's close-range header. It went to a penalty-shootout, which Blackpool won 4–3. Mitch Cook, Paul Groves, Andy Garner and David Eyres were the successful takers for Blackpool, but it was Steve McIlhargey's save from substitute Graham Alexander that set up the victory. After Eyres' effort, Scunthorpe's other substitute, Jason White, stepped up, put the ball over the bar, and Blackpool were promoted.

Blackpool

1McIlhargey
2Burgess 
3Cook
4Groves (c)
5Davies  (for Murphy)
6Gore
7Rodwell
8Horner  (for Sinclair)
9Bamber 
10Garner
11Eyres

Substitutes:

12Murphy  (for Davies)
14Sinclair  (for Horner)

Manager:
Billy Ayre

Scunthorpe United

1Samways
2Joyce
3Longden
4Hill
5Elliott
6Humphries
7Martin
8Hamilton
9Daws   (for White)
10Buckley  (for Alexander)
11Helliwell

Substitutes:

12White  (for Daws)
14Alexander  (for Buckley)

Manager:
Bill Green

Player statistics

Appearances

Players used: 28

Goals

Total goals scored: 88

Transfers

In

Out

Notes

References

Blackpool
1991-92